Billie Jean King defeated Evonne Goolagong in the final, 3–6, 6–3, 7–5 to win the women's singles tennis title at the 1974 US Open. Goolagong was attempting to complete the career Grand Slam.

Margaret Court was the reigning champion, but did not compete this year.

Chris Evert held a 55-match winning streak before being defeated by Goolagong in the semifinals. This was an Open Era record streak length until 1984, when it was surpassed by Martina Navratilova.

This was the last edition of the tournament to be held on grass courts, as it would switch to clay the following year.

Seeds
The seeded players are listed below. Billie Jean King is the champion; others show the round in which they were eliminated.

 Chris Evert (semifinalist)
 Billie Jean King (champion)
 Olga Morozova (withdrew before the tournament began)
 Kerry Melville (quarterfinalist)
 Evonne Goolagong (finalist)
 Rosie Casals (quarterfinalist)
 Virginia Wade (second round)
 Lesley Hunt (quarterfinalist)

Draw

Key
 Q = Qualifier
 WC = Wild card
 LL = Lucky loser
 r = Retired

Final eight

Earlier rounds

Section 1

Section 2

Section 3

Section 4

External links
 1974 US Open on WTAtennis.com, the historical drawsheet
1974 US Open – Women's draws and results at the International Tennis Federation

Women's Singles
US Open (tennis) by year – Women's singles
1974 in women's tennis
1974 in American women's sports